Masons is a novel by Alexey Pisemsky started in the late 1878 and first published in 1880 in Ogonyok magazine (Nos. 1–6, 8-43). Pisemsky who regarded the Freemasonry as a progressive force in Russia of the 1820s and 1830s based the narrative upon his personal childhood memories of the people he knew (among them his uncle Yury Bartenev) who belonged to the lodge.

References

External links
Масоны. The original Russian text

1880 novels
Novels by Aleksey Pisemsky
Novels set in 19th-century Russia